Salvador Flamenco Cabezas   (born 28 February 1947) is a retired footballer from El Salvador.

Career

Professional
Flamenco began his career playing for Quequeisque's youth system, being considered a promising young defender. He played in Primera and Segunda division for Quequeisque. Flamenco was soon signed to a long term professional contract by Adler in 1964. This would hinder as Adler refused to play abroad despite interest from Club America, Toluca and a few clubs from Argentina. Flamenco was eventually able to move to FAS in 1971 and he stayed there until 1973 when he moved to Platense under the tutelage of Jorge Tupinambá. He stayed there until Tupinambá was released, then followed Tupinambá to Firpo and Dragon. He retired from football in 1976.

International career
Flamenco represented his country at the 1968 Summer Olympics and at the 1970 FIFA World Cup in Mexico.

Personal life
Flamenco's brother Jorge also was a professional footballer who played for ADLER.

References

External links

1947 births
Living people
Sportspeople from San Salvador
Salvadoran footballers
El Salvador international footballers
Olympic footballers of El Salvador
Footballers at the 1968 Summer Olympics
1970 FIFA World Cup players
C.D. FAS footballers
C.D. Atlético Marte footballers
Association football forwards